The Dr. Samuel Blumer House is located in New Glarus, Wisconsin.

History
Samuel Blumer was the first physician in New Glarus. The house was added to the State and the National Register of Historic Places in 1992.

References

Houses on the National Register of Historic Places in Wisconsin
National Register of Historic Places in Green County, Wisconsin
Houses in Green County, Wisconsin
Greek Revival architecture in Wisconsin
Limestone buildings in the United States
Houses completed in 1858